The 2012 Shakey's V-League (SVL) season was the ninth season of the Shakey's V-League. There were two indoor conferences for this season.

1st Conference 

The Shakey's V-League 9th Season 1st Conference was the fifteenth conference of Shakey's V-League, a collegiate women's volleyball league in the Philippines founded in 2004. The opening ceremonies was held on April 24, 2012 at the Filoil Flying V Arena in San Juan.

 Participating teams 

 Pool A

 Pool B

Preliminary round 
 Pool A

 Pool B

Quarterfinals

Final round 

 Final standings  

 Individual awards

Open Conference 
The Shakey's V-League 9th Season Open Conference was the sixteenth conference of the Shakey's V-League, commenced on August 19, 2012 at the Ninoy Aquino Stadium in Manila with four commercial clubs joining regular league teams Ateneo de Manila University and Far Eastern University.

Final round 
 All series are best-of-3

Match results 
 All times are in Philippines Standard Time (UTC+08:00)
 3rd place

|}

 Championship

|}

 Final standings 

 Individual awards

Broadcast partner 
 TV5 (AKTV on IBC-13)
 Hyper

References 

2012 in Philippine sport